Paraschistura naseeri is a species of stone loach endemic to Pakistan.

Footnotes 

naseeri
Freshwater fish of Pakistan
Endemic fauna of Pakistan
Fish described in 1963